Carlton Cricket Club is an Australian cricket team that competes in the Victorian Premier Cricket competition. The club was formed in 1864 and plays its home matches at Princes Park in North Carlton. Known as the Blues, Carlton has won ten First XI premierships, most recently in the 2021–22 season. Famous past players include Bill Woodfull, Dean Jones, Keith Stackpole, Abdul Qadir and Carl Hooper.

In 2019, it won the inaugural National Premier Twenty20 Championships.

References

External links

Cricket clubs established in 1864
Victorian Premier Cricket clubs
Cricket clubs in Melbourne
1864 establishments in Australia
Cricket in Melbourne
Sport in the City of Melbourne (LGA)